TUH or tuh may refer to:

Taulil language, New Britain, Papua New Guinea, ISO 639-3 code
Temple University Hospital, an academic medical center in Philadelphia, Pennsylvania
Tulse Hill railway station, London, National Rail station code